Pleasant Ridge Township is located in Livingston County, Illinois. As of the 2010 census, its population was 252 and it contained 90 housing units. Pleasant Ridge Township formed from Saunemin Township in April, 1859.

Geography

Demographics

References

External links
US Census
City-data.com
Illinois State Archives

Townships in Livingston County, Illinois
Populated places established in 1859
Townships in Illinois
1859 establishments in Illinois